Jose Antonio "Bong" Nieva Carrion (June 19, 1948 – March 27, 2017) was a Filipino politician, who was a governor of the province of Marinduque, in the Philippines. He was born in Calapan, Oriental Mindoro, and his grandfather, Juan Morente Nieva, also served as the Governor of Marinduque from 1907 to 1916. In 2011, Carrion was implicated in the assassination of broadcaster Gerry Ortega, although ultimately all charges against him were dismissed. He was married to Filipina singer and politician Imelda Papin.

Governor of Marinduque
Carrion first became the governor of Marinduque during the 1995 gubernatorial election. He served from 1995 to 1998. It was during his term as governor that the Marcopper mining disaster happened in Boac, Marinduque. Known as one of the largest mining disasters in the Philippines, it was estimated it would take 25 years and 300 million pesos to rehabilitate the area.

Carrion unsuccessfully ran for re-election thrice as a member of the Pwersa ng Masang Pilipino party, in 1998, 2001, and in 2004. Carrion ran again in 2007 as an independent and successfully won the election, defeating the incumbent Carmencita Reyes. Carrion promised to focus on transforming Marinduque to an eco-tourism spot during his second incumbency as governor, detailing an 8-point Execute Agenda during his State of the Provincial Address. Carrion also spent his second term building infrastructure in the province, through coordinating with baranggay units in the creation of farm-to-market roads, construction of school buildings, and institution of agricultural programs.

In 2010, Ombudsman Merceditas Gutierrez ordered the stoppage of a "midnight deal" involving allegedly overpriced personal computers worth over P18 million. Carrion denied all charges of overpricing, and that no midnight realignment of funds occurred. He has claimed that the allegations were incorrect and misleading.

Carrion served until 2010, but was again unsuccessful in securing the re-election in 2010 and 2013. His final bid for re-election in 2013 was unsuccessful, and he was defeated by Reyes.

Assassination of Gerry Ortega

On January 24, 2011, Palawan journalist Gerry Ortega was assassinated after finishing his radio show. One of the suspects, Rodolfo Edrad, Jr. confessed shortly after and claimed to be a former bodyguard of Carrion's. In Edrad's confession, he named Carrion and former Palawan governor Joel Reyes as the masterminds of the assassination. Carrion confirmed that Edrad was indeed a former security aide, however, he denied ever talking to him about any plot.

Ultimately, the Department of Justice dismissed all charges against him and 5 others implicated in the assassination plot due to lack of sufficient evidence to indict them.

Personal life
Carrion was married to Filipina singer Imelda Papin, with whom he had one daughter Maria France Imelda Papin Carrion. Maria France graduated as a Bachelor of Mass Communication at the University of Nevada Las Vegas, and is now a paralegal. However, Carrion and Papin had their marriage annulled. Prior to his marriage to Papin, Carrion also had one son, Chino. After his marriage to Papin, Carrion went on to marry Armi Carrion. Carrion had one sister, Maria Rosa "Bing Carrion-Buck, who is an author.

Death
On March 27, 2017, Carrion died in Manila, due to complications arising from lung cancer. He is survived by his wife, Armi, his son, and his daughter.

References

External links
 Official website

1948 births
2017 deaths
Governors of Marinduque
People from Marinduque
Pwersa ng Masang Pilipino politicians
People from Oriental Mindoro
Lakas–CMD politicians